Worth (1909–1912) was an American Thoroughbred race horse. He was the winner of the 1912 Kentucky Derby, an achievement he is best known for.

Background and family 
Worth was bred in Kentucky by R.H. McCarter Porter.He was sired by Knight of the Thistle, a stakes-winning stallion who was imported to the United States (New Jersey) in 1899. During his racing career, Knight of the Thistle won the inaugural 1843 Royal Hunt Cup, Great Jubilee Handicap, and Limekiln Stakes. Through his grandson King Plaudit (sired by Kentucky Derby winner Plaudit), Knight of the Thistle is an ancestor to American Quarter Horse Hall of Famer Maddon's Bright Eyes.

Worth's dam, Miss Hanover (by Hanover), won her first start at Pimlico in 1899, defeating Pink Domino, the dam of Belmont Stakes winner and prominent sire Sweep and Curiosity, the dam of American Champion Juvenile Novelty. Miss Hanover was also the dam of 1916 Alabama Stakes winner Malachite and multiple stakes winner Hanovia.

Worth's full sister, Fair Atlanta, is the dam of Dangerous, winner of the 1925 Travers Stakes and Belmont Stakes runner-up. Dangerous was trained by Carroll Shilling, the jockey that rode Worth in his Kentucky Derby. Fair Atlanta is also the dam of multiple stakes winners Bondage, Georgie, and Thessaly.

Racing career 
Trained by Frank M. Taylor, Worth won the 1912 Bashford Manor Stakes and Raceland Stakes as a juvenile. He was the top racehorse, based on earnings, in 1911 and would earn American Champion Two-Year-Old Colt honors in 1911.

Worth's biggest career win came in 1912 as a three-year-old when he took the 1912 Kentucky Derby. Ridden by jockey C. H. Shilling, the favored frontrunner Worth held off longshot Duval to win by a neck margin. His final time of 2:09.40 is among the slowest in the Derby's history.

His other wins included the 1912 Chesapeake Stakes and 1912 Latonia Handicap.

Death 
On November 6, 1912, Worth was severely injured during a race run at the Pimlico Race Course in Baltimore, Maryland. Worth's jockey, McTaggart, rode too closely to another horse, causing a three-horse collision that severely injured two other jockeys and severed two tendons in Worth's leg.  Worth was euthanized shortly after this incident due to blood poisoning from his extensive injuries.

Pedigree

References

1909 racehorse births
1912 racehorse deaths
Racehorses bred in Kentucky
Racehorses trained in the United States
Kentucky Derby winners
Horses who died from racing injuries
Thoroughbred family 6-a